The 2011–12 Western Carolina Catamounts men's basketball team represents Western Carolina University during the 2011–12 college basketball season. This is head coach Larry Hunter's seventh season at Western Carolina. The Catamounts compete in the Southern Conference and play their home games at the Ramsey Center.

Roster

Schedule and results

|-
!colspan=9| Regular season

|- 
!colspan=9| Southern Conference tournament

References

Western Carolina
Western Carolina Catamounts men's basketball seasons
West
West